Liolaemus lopezi is a species of lizard in the family Iguanidae.  It is found in Chile, and more recently, El Salvador.

References

lopezi
Lizards of South America
Reptiles of Chile
Endemic fauna of Chile
Reptiles described in 2005